Rock Star is a 2001 American musical comedy-drama film directed by Stephen Herek from a script by John Stockwell, and starring Mark Wahlberg and Jennifer Aniston. It tells the story of Chris "Izzy" Cole, a tribute band singer who ascends to the position of lead vocalist in his favorite band.

The script was inspired by the real-life story of Tim "Ripper" Owens, a singer in a Judas Priest tribute band who was chosen to replace singer Rob Halford when he left the band. After optioning the filming rights to a New York Times profile of Owens by Andrew Revkin, Warner Bros. hired Stockwell to write the script. Brad Pitt was initially signed to play the lead role, but left due to creative differences, and Wahlberg was eventually hired for the part.

Rock Star garnered mixed reviews from critics and was a box office flop, grossing $19 million worldwide against a production budget of $57 million.

Plot
In the mid-1980s, Pittsburgh resident Chris Cole is a fanatical admirer of a heavy metal band called Steel Dragon. By day, Chris is a photocopier technician and by night, he is the lead singer of a Steel Dragon tribute band called Blood Pollution (the name is taken from a Steel Dragon song).

Internal struggles among the actual Steel Dragon band members culminate with the firing of their lead singer, Bobby Beers, and the beginning of recruitment sessions to find a new vocalist. Chris experiences his own strife with his Blood Pollution bandmates, particularly guitarist Rob Malcolm. During a show, Rob plays a guitar solo instead of following the note-for-note accuracy to the original Steel Dragon song and, after Chris sabotages Rob's amplifier mid-song, a fight breaks out between the two onstage. The next day, Chris goes to rehearsal but he finds out that he has been replaced by his arch-rival, the erstwhile lead singer of another Steel Dragon tribute band. Rob and Chris argue, and Rob criticizes Chris for preferring to remain the singer in a tribute band rather than create his own music.

One day, Chris receives an unexpected phone call from Steel Dragon's founder and rhythm guitarist, Kirk Cuddy, and is offered an audition for the band (thanks to two of Blood Pollution's groupies, who showed Kirk a videotape of one of Blood Pollution's concerts). After hanging up on Kirk once, thinking he's being pranked by Rob, Chris ecstatically agrees. At the studio, he meets the band and gives an outstanding performance of "We All Die Young" (a Steel Dragon song in the movie, but it is a real song by Steelheart, whose lead vocalist, Miljenko Matijevic, provides Cole's singing voice for the film). Chris joins the band as their new singer, adopting the stage name "Izzy". Following a successful debut concert with Steel Dragon, Izzy must come to grips with the pressures of his new-found fame and success. The band embarks on a lengthy tour and Izzy experiences the excesses of the lifestyle, with the group's road manager, Mats, serving as a sympathetic mentor to Izzy.

His new lifestyle impacts his life both for better and worse, particularly with his relationship with his supportive girlfriend, Emily Poule, when she decides not to continue with him throughout the remainder of the tour as a rock star girlfriend, though Emily and Izzy agree to get back together when the tour reaches Seattle. Eventually, Steel Dragon stops in Seattle for a show, and Emily arrives at his hotel room as they had previously arranged, although Izzy has become so inebriated while on tour he forgot about the arrangement and does not even know what city he is in. Although taken aback by all the groupies, Emily still tries to reconnect with him, reminding him of their plans to meet up once he got to Seattle; however he is too intoxicated to really understand what she is saying, eventually suggesting they go to Seattle together. Heartbroken with his inconsiderate behavior, intoxication and the fact that he is having sex with so many groupies, Emily leaves him.

Six months later, Izzy reports to the next series of Steel Dragon recording sessions with song concepts and artwork for the band's next album. The rest of the band like his ideas, but they reject them, with Kirk explaining that the band has to stay true to the "Steel Dragon thing" to fulfill fan expectations. Izzy is angered upon realizing that he was only recruited for his vocal abilities. After a heartfelt conversation with Mats about how he feared he had no control over the direction life has taken him, Izzy begins to reconsider his rock star lifestyle. On the next tour, in a scene directly paralleling one near the beginning of the film with their roles reversed, Izzy hears a fan singing along with him toward the end of a live concert. Impressed, Izzy pulls the fan, who introduces himself as Thor, onstage and hands him the microphone to finish the concert.  Backstage, Izzy realizes that what he thought he wanted for so long was not what he wanted, and he says goodbye to Mats, departing from the band while doing so.

After leaving Steel Dragon and ditching his rock star image and stage name, Chris makes his way to Seattle and starts a new band with his old friend and former bandmate, Rob, allowing him to write his own music. Chris finds Emily working in the coffee shop she and her roommate purchased a few years earlier, and he is initially too ashamed to speak to her. While walking one evening, Emily sees a flyer for his band posted on the wall and takes it down. In the final scene, Chris is singing with his band in a bar and Emily walks in. Chris leaves the stage and speaks to her. They reconcile, ending the film with a kiss and the final note of Chris' first original song "Colorful" (which is a real song by The Verve Pipe).

During the credits, Cuddy talks about the future of the band and Bobby Beers is shown to have taken up Irish Dancing after his sacking from Steel Dragon.

Cast
The band members are portrayed by ex-Dokken and current Foreigner bassist Jeff Pilson; Black Label Society founder and Ozzy Osbourne guitarist Zakk Wylde; actor Dominic West; and ex-Foreigner and Black Country Communion drummer Jason Bonham (the son of the late  John Bonham, drummer for Led Zeppelin). Myles Kennedy, who was at the time the lead vocalist of The Mayfield Four and now the front man of Alter Bridge and Slash's solo project, makes a cameo appearance.

The singing voice for Wahlberg's character was provided by Steelheart frontman Miljenko Matijevic for the Steel Dragon Songs, and the final number was sung by Brian Vander Ark of The Verve Pipe. Jeff Scott Soto (of Talisman, Yngwie Malmsteen, Soul SirkUS, and Journey) provided the voice of Jason Flemyng's character Bobby Beers. Ralph Saenz (Steel Panther) also appears briefly, as the singer auditioning ahead of Chris at the studio.

Tribute band Blood Pollution is also made up of known musical artists, including guitarist Nick Catanese (Black Label Society), drummer Blas Elias (Slaughter), and bassist Brian Vander Ark (The Verve Pipe, who also contributed a song to the film's soundtrack). Actor Timothy Olyphant portrays Blood Pollution's guitarist, Rob Malcolm.  Bradley, the singer who replaces Chris in Blood Pollution, is played by Third Eye Blind frontman Stephan Jenkins.

Production
After The New York Times ran a story on Tim "Ripper" Owens in 1997, various Hollywood studios ran to option the filming rights. Warner Bros. won the bid, and hired John Stockwell to write the script. Stockwell soon began researching the heavy metal music and tribute band scene and visited Owens' hometown of Akron, Ohio. Afterwards the project, under the working title Metal God, got the involvement of George Clooney's newly founded Maysville Pictures. Brad Pitt signed to star in 1998, but wound up dropping the project following creative differences with the studio. Eventually Mark Wahlberg, a former rapper with Marky Mark and the Funky Bunch who co-starred with Clooney in Three Kings, was hired for the main role in May 1999. Stephen Herek signed to direct in October, and the following month Jennifer Aniston became attached for the main female role, while Callie Khouri was hired to revise the script. Judas Priest were initially approached, but the band had some objections to the initial script and were phased out as it was rewritten into a more original story loosely based on the facts, in spite of the band still offering to give advice and assistance to the production.

Wahlberg spent five months preparing for his role as Chris Cole, working with a vocal coach, growing his hair, attending the metal scene and wandering around Los Angeles in-character. A concert scene was shot at the Los Angeles Memorial Sports Arena before 10,000 Metallica and Megadeth fans. 
While filming one Steel Dragon performance, the crew pranked Wahlberg by playing Marky Mark's "Good Vibrations" instead of a rock track, and footage of this is featured during the film's end credits. By 2001, Warner renamed the project from Metal God to Rock Star in order to attract a broader rock fandom instead of just metal fans.

Reception

The website's consensus states: "Like its title, Rock Star is rather generic, being not so much about the heavy metal scene than about rock cliches and formula". On Metacritic, the film has a score of 54 out of 100 based on 32 reviews, indicating "mixed or average reviews". Audiences surveyed by CinemaScore gave the film a grade "B−" on scale of A to F.

Roger Ebert of the Chicago Sun-Times gave it 2.5 out of 4 stars and wrote: "By the end of the film I conceded, yes, there are good performances and the period is well captured, but the movie didn't convince me of the feel and the flavor of its experiences."

Tim "Ripper" Owens, the inspiration for the story, noted to Rolling Stone that while he considered Rock Star "a Spinal Tap kind of movie" that distanced from the real facts to feature "all the cliches of sex, drugs, and rock and roll", he found the portrayal of the band members as accurate and was still flattered to become the basis for a movie. When Judas Priest bassist Ian Hill was asked about his reaction to Rock Star in an interview in PopMatters magazine, he said "I mean, I quite enjoyed the movie.  It was entertaining, you know?" Hill was quoted as saying "It had nothing to do with Rob Halford, Ripper Owens and Judas Priest, it's got nothing to do with that, whatsoever. It was fiction. Apart from the fact that 'Local Boy Makes Good'? That was the only true aspect of the movie." Hill was quick to add "I watched it once. I don't have the urge to watch it again."

Soundtrack

A small number of the songs featured in the film and on the soundtrack were released after the dates given in the film. They are marked with an asterisk.

Partial list of songs that were featured in the movie but did not appear on the soundtrack CD:
 AC/DC – "Are You Ready"*
 Culture Club – "Karma Chameleon"
 Def Leppard – "Let's Get Rocked"*
 Def Leppard – "Rock! Rock! (Till You Drop)"
 Foghat – "Chateau Lafitte '59 Boogie"
 Frankie Goes to Hollywood – "Relax"
 Marky Mark and the Funky Bunch – "Good Vibrations"
 Ralph Saenz, Peter Beckett, and Steve Plunkett – "California Girls" (The Beach Boys cover)
 Talking Heads – "Once in a Lifetime"
 Steel Dragon – "Reckless" (Phoenix Down cover)
 Jennifer Aniston - Believe in Me
 Trevor Rabin - Batman Theme
 Steel Dragon - Crown of Falsehood (written by Zakk Wylde)
 Pat King & Brian Grant - Sheedy's

Year-end charts

Home media
The film was released on DVD and VHS on January 22, 2002 by Warner Home Video.

References

External links

 
 
 

2001 films
2001 comedy films
2001 drama films
2000s American films
2000s English-language films
2000s musical comedy-drama films
American musical comedy-drama films
American rock music films
Films about musical groups
Films directed by Stephen Herek
Films scored by Trevor Rabin
Films set in the 1980s
Films set in Pittsburgh
Films shot in Los Angeles
Heavy metal films
Warner Bros. films